Edwige Bancole is a Beninese sprinter. She competed in the women's 100 metres at the 1980 Summer Olympics. She was the first woman to represent Benin at the Olympics.

References

Year of birth missing (living people)
Living people
Athletes (track and field) at the 1980 Summer Olympics
Beninese female sprinters
Olympic athletes of Benin
Place of birth missing (living people)
Olympic female sprinters